Beauty and the Beast is a 1978 Czechoslovak dark fantasy horror film directed by Slovak film director Juraj Herz. The film is a re-telling of the classic tale Beauty and the Beast.

For his direction, Herz received the Medalla Sitges en Oro de Ley at the Sitges Film Festival in 1979.

Plot
Julie is a bankrupt merchant's daughter, who is the only one of the three daughters, chooses to save her father's life. She goes to the Haunted Wood's Castle where she meets the Beast. He has no qualms about killing Julie, but her beauty prevents him from doing so. Although Julie is forbidden to look at the Beast, she starts to fall in love with him and the love rescues the Beast from his curse.

Cast
 Zdena Studenková as Julie
 Vlastimil Harapes as The Beast
 Václav Voska as Father
 Jana Brejchová as Gábinka
 Zuzana Kocúriková as Málinka
 Marta Hrachovinová as The Girl
 Vít Olmer as Jezdec
 Milan Hein as Zenich

Reception
David Melville from Senses of Cinema wrote, "Panna a netvor has the capacity to horrify in the best and the worst of ways. Yet like any true fairy tale, it is unlikely ever to leave its audience bored or indifferent".

References

External links
 
 
 "Panna a netvor" at the Česko-Slovenská filmová databáze.
 "Panna a netvor" at the Filmová databáze.
 Screen captures and production maps for "Panna a netvor" at Filmová místa.

1978 films
1978 horror films
1970s fantasy films
1970s monster movies
Czech horror films
1970s Czech-language films
Czechoslovak fantasy films
Czech dark fantasy films
Films based on Beauty and the Beast
Films directed by Juraj Herz
Films scored by Petr Hapka
1970s Czech films